Around 624,000 people of Azerbaijan have varying degrees of disability, which makes up about 6.4% of the population.

History
The country ratified the Convention on the Rights of Persons with Disabilities (CRPD) in January 2009. In January 2011, it submitted state party report on measures taken to give effect to its obligation under CRPD and on the progress made with regards to that to the Committee on the Rights of Persons with Disabilities.

Classifications
The majority of disabled people in the country have physical impairment, sensory impairment, or mental impairment.

Laws
The Disability Prevention and Disabled Persons (Rehabilitation and Social Protection) Act 1992 law prohibits the discrimination against any disabled child. The Law on Children's Rights protects disabled children in a range of areas.

Institutions
There are 14 rehabilitation centers for people with disability in the country which take care about 10,000 disabled people annually.

Public facilities
In 2019, Baku Metro initiated a program to allocate two staffs to chaperone disabled commuters through their destination.

Sport
Azerbaijan made its Paralympic Games debut at the 1996 Summer Paralympics in Atlanta, with a two-man delegation to compete in track and field and powerlifting. It has taken part in every subsequent edition of the Summer Paralympics, but has never participated in the Winter Paralympics.

See also
 Azerbaijani Sign Language

References